1,6-Hexanediol diglycidyl ether is an organic chemical in the glycidyl ether family. It is an aliphatic compound that is a colorless liquid. It has two epoxide (oxirane) groups per molecule. Its main use is in modifying epoxy resins especially viscosity reduction whilst flexibilizing. It is REACH registered.

Manufacture
1,6-Hexanediol and epichlorohydrin are reacted in the presence of a Lewis acid as catalyst to form a halohydrin: each hydroxyl group of the diol reacts with an epoxide on epichlorohydrin. This process is followed by washing with sodium hydroxide to re-form the epoxide rings in a dehydrochlorination reaction. One of the quality control tests would involve measuring the Epoxy value by determination of the epoxy equivalent weight.

Uses
Its main use is for reduction of viscosity in epoxy resin systems - it is thus an epoxy reactive diluent. The chain length helps give some degree of flexibility as an epoxy resin has rigid aromatic rings which are planar. These systems may then be formulated into CASE applications: Coatings,  Adhesives, Sealants, Elastomers, and composite materials. The use of the diluent does effect mechanical properties and microstructure of epoxy resins.

Toxicity
The toxicity is fairly well understood. It is classed as a skin irritant, skin sensitizer, allergen and has caused contact dermatitis.

See also
 Epoxide
 Glycidol

References

Glycidyl ethers
Reactive diluents

External websites
 Hexion difunctional epoxy diluents
  Epoxy diluent: 1,6-hexanediol diglycidyl ether Wanjie International
 Denacol epoxy diluent range
 Cargill Reactive diluents